Aṣ-Ṣirāṭ al-mustaqīm is the Arabic term for "the straight path". In an Islamic context, it has been interpreted as "the right path", has been variously translated as "the Middle Way" and as "that which pleases God". 

There are five obligatory daily prayers in Islam. During every cycle of each prayer the following phrase is included:
Ihdinā ṣ-ṣirāṭa al-mustaqīm, Ṣirāṭa al-laḏīna anʿamta ʿalayhim ġayri l-maġḍūbi ʿalayhim walā ḍ-ḍāllīn
''Show us the straight path, The path of those You bestowed favor upon, not anger upon, and not of those who go astray.

This is part of the Surah Al-Fatiha.

The Sirat-al-Mustaqim refers to the path of Islam which leads on to the path of success in the hereafter.

In Islam, Allah has told the Muslims to be on the middle way, the straight path, and not to go upon the 'other paths', which Mujāhid said, it refers to innovations and doubtful matters. Doubtful, or disliked, matters are Makruh, and are not considered a sin, but as the grey area between good and evil. It is said that if you do the Makruh things, you will not be punished, but if you avoid them, Allah will reward you.

See also
Matthew 7:14 - the Christian Bible passage recounting Jesus' Sermon on the Mount, which also underlines the importance of 'the straight path' in Abrahamic religion.

References

External links.
Sirat Al-Mustaqim or Siratulmustaqim
Open Our Eyes to the Sirat-al-Mustaqim (The straight path)

Arabic words and phrases
Islamic eschatology
Al-Fatiha
Islamic terminology
Al-Baqara
An-Nisa
An-Nur